Janice Ruth Munt (born 3 November 1955) is an Australian politician. Munt was born in Melbourne, Victoria.  She was educated at Highett High School. Before entering politics she was variously a company director, shop assistant, hair dresser's assistant, waitress, cook, clerk, employee of the Federal Department of Education, and customer service agent.

A member of the Labor Party, she represented the Electoral district of Mordialloc in the Victorian Legislative Assembly from 2002 until her defeat in 2010. Munt was targeted by right to life organisations during her election campaign in 2010, having voted for abortion reform in parliament during 2008. While a factor in her defeat, other issues such as the expected swing against a long-serving government, public transport, health, and utility pricing were important factors during campaigning in her electorate.

References

Additional Resources
Australian Women Biographical Entry.  Accessed 12 April 2006.
Parliamentary Handbook entry.  Accessed 12 April 2006.

External links
Official website

1955 births
Living people
Members of the Victorian Legislative Assembly
21st-century Australian politicians
21st-century Australian women politicians
Women members of the Victorian Legislative Assembly